Aliguay is an island in the Philippines, and a barangay of Dapitan. The island is an established marine sanctuary. The island is surrounded by white sand beaches and coral reefs. There are no water sources on the island. A few residents live on Aliguay Island, mostly selling fish to tourists.

2015 Kidnapping and Beheading
More than 10 armed men abducted at dawn Monday, May 4, 2015. Rodolfo Buligao, Aliguay's Barangay Captain at the time, and two members of the Philippine Coast Guard were kidnapped by the Abu Sayyaf.
The suspects turned to these 3 men after failing to see foreign tourists in what could have been a plan for kidnapping-for-ransom. The military found a beheaded body of a man believed to be Buligao. It was spotted along an intersection in Barangay Laum Maimbung, Maimbung town, Province of Sulu.

Demographics

See also
 List of islands of the Philippines

References

External links
 Aliguay Island at OpenStreetMap

Islands of Zamboanga del Norte
Barangays of Zamboanga del Norte
Dapitan
Tourist attractions in Zamboanga del Norte
Protected landscapes and seascapes of the Philippines